Tania Raquel Riso Ayala (born 26 January 1994) is a Paraguayan footballer who plays as a centre back for Spanish club SE AEM and the Paraguay women's national team.

References

External links

Tania Riso at BDFutbol

1994 births
Living people
Sportspeople from Asunción
Paraguayan women's footballers
Women's association football central defenders
12 de Octubre Football Club players
Deportivo Capiatá players
SE AEM players
Paraguay women's international footballers
Footballers at the 2019 Pan American Games
Pan American Games competitors for Paraguay
Paraguayan expatriate women's footballers
Paraguayan expatriate sportspeople in Spain
Expatriate women's footballers in Spain